Beverlywood is a neighborhood in the Westside of the city of Los Angeles, California.

History
Beverlywood was developed in 1940 by Walter H. Leimert, who also developed Leimert Park. The neighborhood consists of 1,354 single family homes, and was one of the first neighborhoods in the Los Angeles area to have binding CC&Rs. These regulations, which are administered by the Beverlywood Homes Association, strictly limit housing size, style, color, and design along with additional restrictions on landscaping, and are enforced by a review committee. Additionally, all residents are required to pay the fees to the Beverlywood Home Association.

In recent years, the neighborhood has become a hotspot for mansionization. Despite complying with HOA regulations, many residents believe that the newer and larger houses ruin the feel of the neighborhood and have been successfully campaigning the Los Angeles City Council for regulations to restrict new home sizes.

Geography

Beverlywood Homes Association
The borders of the Beverlywood Homes Association are as follows: Monte Mar Drive to the north, Hillcrest Country Club and Anchor Avenue to the west, Beverlywood Street to the south, and Robertson Boulevard to the east. These borders are marked by entrance monuments and signs. Beverlywood is flanked on the north  by Pico-Robertson; on the east by Crestview, La Cienega Heights, and Reynier Village; on the south by Castle Heights; and on the west by Cheviot Hills. This puts Beverlywood inside of California's 37th congressional district and California's 54th State Assembly district.

Mapping L.A.
The Mapping L.A. boundaries of Beverlywood, which are broader than those recognized by the Beverlywood Homes Association, include areas not subject to the rules and regulations that limit housing size, style, color, and design.

According to the Mapping L.A. project of the Los Angeles Times, Beverlywood is flanked on the north  by Pico-Robertson, on the east by Mid-City, on the south by Palms, and on the west by Cheviot Hills. Beverlywood's street and other borders are given as: north, Cashio Street and Airdrome Street; east. Canfield Avenue and Robertson Boulevard; south, Cattaraugus Avenue; and west, Beverwil Drive and the boundary with the Hillcrest Country Club.

These wider boundaries include the neighborhoods of both Castle Heights and West Helms, which are served by different neighborhood associations (though all part of the South Robertson Neighborhoods Council).

Population

Within the Mapping L.A. boundaries, the 2000 U.S. census counted 6,080 residents in the 0.79-square-mile Beverlywood neighborhood—an average of 7,654 people per square mile, about average for the city. In 2008, the city estimated that the population had increased to 6,418. The median age for residents was 39, older than the city at large; the percentages of residents aged 35 to 49 and 65 and older were among the county's highest.

The neighborhood was considered "not especially diverse" ethnically, with a high percentage of white people. The breakdown was whites*, 80%; Asians, 7.3%; Latinos, 6.1%; blacks, 4.2%; and others, 2.4%.  *Iran (12.1%) and *Israel (9.3%) were the most common places of birth for the 24.5% of the residents who were born abroad—considered a low figure for Los Angeles.

The median yearly household income in 2008 dollars was $105,253, a high figure for Los Angeles, and the percentage of households earning $125,000 and up was also considered high for the county. The average household size of 2.5 people was average for Los Angeles. Renters occupied 29.7% of the housing stock and house- or apartment owners held 70.3%.

In 2000 there were 113 families headed by single parents, a low rate for the city and the county. The percentages of veterans who served during World War II or the Korean War were among the county's highest.

Education
Fifty-five percent of Beverlywood residents aged 25 and older had earned a four-year degree by 2000, a high figure for both the city and the county. The percentages of residents of that age with a bachelor's degree or a master's degree were also considered high for the county.

The schools within Beverlywood are as follows:

 Canfield Avenue Elementary School, LAUSD, 9233 Airdrome Street
 Castle Heights Elementary School, LAUSD, 9755 Cattaraugus Avenue
 Cheviot Hills Continuation School, LAUSD, 9200 Cattaraugus Avenue

Zoned secondary schools:
 Palms Middle School
 Hamilton High School

Parks and recreation
The Beverlywood Homes Association owns and maintains several private parks in the neighborhood, which, with the exception of Circle Park, are gated and only accessible to Beverlywood residents.

See also
 List of districts and neighborhoods in Los Angeles

References

External links
 Beverlywood Homes Association
 Los Angeles Times, Real Estate section, Neighborly Advice column: "[Beverlywood:] A mid-cities look that's lasted" (28 Dec 2003)
 Comments about living in Beverlywood
 Beverlywood crime map and statistics

Neighborhoods in Los Angeles
West Los Angeles
Westside (Los Angeles County)